Westminster Theological Seminary is a Protestant theological seminary in the Reformed theological tradition in Glenside, Pennsylvania. It was founded by members of the faculty of Princeton Theological Seminary in 1929 after Princeton chose to take a liberal direction during the Fundamentalist–Modernist controversy.

History

Westminster Theological Seminary was formed in 1929, largely under the leadership and funding of J. Gresham Machen. Though independent, it has a close relationship with the Orthodox Presbyterian Church, which Machen helped found in 1936. The seminary was founded by members of the faculty of Princeton Theological Seminary, following a controversy over the liberal direction that Princeton was beginning to take. Westminster Theological Seminary considers itself to be the faithful continuation of Princeton's historic theological tradition. Many of the founders of Westminster, including Machen, John Murray, Oswald Allis, Robert Dick Wilson, and Cornelius Van Til, had been professors at Princeton prior to the controversy. The first president of the seminary was Edmund Clowney, who served from 1966 until 1984. He was followed by George C. Fuller and Samuel T. Logan. The current president is Peter Lillback, who also serves as a professor of historical theology.

In 1982, the California branch of Westminster became an independent institution, the Westminster Seminary California, and in 2009 the Dallas branch was established as Redeemer Theological Seminary and since 2017 has been Reformed Theological Seminary's Dallas campus.

Theological position

In Philadelphia on September 25, 1929, J. Gresham Machen declared the following in his inaugural address: "We believe, first, that the Christian religion, as set forth in the Confession of Faith of the Presbyterian Church, is true; we believe, second, that the Christian religion welcomes and is capable of scholarly defense; and we believe, third, that the Christian religion should be proclaimed without fear or favor, and in clear opposition to whatever opposes it, whether from within or without the church, as the only way of salvation for lost mankind. On that platform, brethren, we stand. Pray that we may be enabled by God’s grace to stand firm. Pray that the students who go forth from Westminster Theological Seminary may know Christ as their own Savior and may proclaim to others the gospel of his love."The current board and faculty continue to hold to this original vision. All trustees and faculty members are required to affirm their agreement with the theological perspective presented in the Westminster Confession of Faith and the Larger and Shorter Catechisms, the core doctrinal statements of many Presbyterian denominations.

Westminster's strict adherence to the Westminster Standards and to Protestant  theology in general has led to several dismissals of tenured faculty members since 1980.  In 1981, theology professor Norman Shepherd was fired from Westminster due to his views on the doctrine of justification by faith alone.  In 2008, Old Testament professor Peter Enns was dismissed from Westminster over controversial views expressed in his book Inspiration and Incarnation: Evangelicals and the Problem of the Old Testament, and in 2014 Old Testament professor Douglas Green was terminated from his position over his views on the relationship between the Old Testament and the New Testament.

In the early 1990s, Middle States Association of Colleges and Schools disputed with Westminster because of its refusal to give women membership on the board of trustees. The accrediting body backed down after the United States Department of Education took the seminary's side in the dispute.

Academics
The seminary currently offers the following degrees: Master of Divinity (M.Div.), Master of Arts (MA), Master of Theology (Th.M.), Doctor of Philosophy (Ph.D.), and Doctor of Ministry (D.Min.).

Westminster publishes the semi-annual Westminster Theological Journal.

Accreditation
Westminster, under a charter from the Commonwealth of Pennsylvania granted in 1930 and as subsequently amended, has the power to grant the degrees of Master of Arts in Counseling, Master of Arts (Religion), Master of Divinity, Master of Theology, Doctor of Ministry, and Doctor of Philosophy.

Westminster received accreditation in 1954 by the Middle States Commission on Higher Education and is also accredited by the Association of Theological Schools in the United States and Canada

Legacy
According to Roger E. Olson, Westminster has had an influence on evangelicalism far beyond its size. Beyond Westminster's impact in the theological realm, the pioneering work of J. Alan Groves and his students has produced the codification of the Westminster Leningrad Codex, which underlies all modern Bible software.

People

Leadership
 Edmund Clowney (1966–1984)
 George C. Fuller (1984–1991)
 Samuel T. Logan (1991–2005)
 Peter Lillback (2005–present)

Notable faculty (past and present)

 Jay E. Adams
 Oswald Thompson Allis
 Gregory Beale
 Harvie M. Conn
 Ray Dillard
 William Edgar
 Peter Enns
 Sinclair Ferguson
 John Frame
 Richard Gaffin
 Richard Gamble
 John Gerstner
 Robert Godfrey
 J. Alan Groves
 R. Laird Harris
 D. G. Hart
 Philip Edgecumbe Hughes
 Kent Hughes
 Rienk Kuiper
 Peter Lillback
 Tremper Longman
 John Gresham Machen
 Allan MacRae
 Jack Miller
 John Murray
 Manuel Ortiz
 Vern Poythress
 O. Palmer Robertson
 Norman Shepherd
 Moisés Silva
 Ned Bernard Stonehouse
 Carl R. Trueman
 Chad Van Dixhoorn
 Cornelius Van Til
 Bruce Waltke
 Robert Dick Wilson
 Paul Woolley
 Edward Joseph Young

Notable alumni

 Greg Bahnsen
 Susan Wise Bauer
 Joel Beeke
 Alistair Begg
 Ralph Blair
 Robert M. Bowman, Jr.
 Anthony Bradley
 Eugene S. Callender
 Edward John Carnell
 Stafford Carson
 Edmund Clowney
 Harvie M. Conn
 Jack Cottrell
 Glenn Davies
 Stephen Dempster
 Mariano Di Gangi
 Ray Dillard
 Chad Van Dixhoorn
 William Edgar
 Peter Enns
 John Frame
 Bob Fu
 Richard Gaffin
 John Gerstner
 Bruce L. Gordon
 Thomas David Gordon
 J. Alan Groves
 Wayne Grudem
 Chulha Han
 Allan Harman
 Edward F. Hills
 Paul King Jewett
 Karen H. Jobes
 James B. Jordan
 Gordon Keddie
 Timothy Keller
 John Euiwhan Kim
 Meredith Kline
 William L. Lane
 Peter Leithart
 Robert Letham
 Peter Lillback
 Samuel T. Logan
 Tremper Longman
 George Marsden
 Taylor Marshall
 Carl McIntire
 J. Ramsey Michaels
 Bruce Miller
 C. John Miller
 Robert Morey
 Harold Ockenga
 Deok-Kyo Oh
 C. Herbert Oliver 
 Manuel Ortiz
 Yun Sun Park
 Vern Poythress
 Richard L. Pratt, Jr.
 H. Evan Runner
 Philip Ryken
 Francis Schaeffer
 Moisés Silva
 James Skillen
 Bong-Ho Son
 Robert Sungenis
 Joni Eareckson Tada
 Willem A. VanGemeren
 Kevin Vanhoozer
 Marten Woudstra

See also
 List of Westminster Theological Seminary people
 North China Theological Seminary (the "Westminster Seminary of China")

References

External links
 

 
Orthodox Presbyterian Church
Presbyterianism in Pennsylvania
Universities and colleges in Montgomery County, Pennsylvania
Educational institutions established in 1929
Seminaries and theological colleges in Pennsylvania
1929 establishments in Pennsylvania